Liverpool is a city in Merseyside, England, historically in Lancashire.

Liverpool may also refer to:

Places

Antarctica
 Liverpool Beach

Australia
 Liverpool, New South Wales
 City of Liverpool (New South Wales) 
 Electoral district of Liverpool
 Liverpool Plains, an agricultural area of New South Wales
 Liverpool Plains Shire, a local government area of New South Wales
 Liverpool River

Canada
 Liverpool, Nova Scotia

United Kingdom
 Liverpool (European Parliament constituency)

United States
 Liverpool, Illinois
 Liverpool, Lake County, Indiana
 Liverpool, New York
 Liverpool, Pennsylvania
 Liverpool, Texas
 East Liverpool, Ohio

Sports 
 A.F.C. Liverpool, a semi-professional football club based in Liverpool, England
 City of Liverpool F.C., a football club based in Liverpool, England, in the Northern Premier League 
 Liverpool City (1906), a defunct rugby league team based in Liverpool that played from 1906 to 1907
 Liverpool Football Club, the name of the Liverpool-based rugby union club until it merged with another club to form Liverpool St Helens F.C.
 Liverpool F.C., a Premier League football club based in Liverpool, England
 Liverpool F.C. (Montevideo), a football club based in Montevideo, Uruguay
 Liverpool Stanley, defunct rugby league team playing from 1951 to 1968
 Liverpool, a type of horse jumping obstacle
 South Liverpool F.C., a football club based in Liverpool, England

Arts and entertainment 
 Liverpool (2008 film), an Argentine film set in Tierra del Fuego
 Liverpool (2012 film), a Canadian film set in Montreal
 Liverpool (album), a 1986 album by Frankie Goes To Hollywood
 Liverpool, a Brazilian band later renamed as Bixo da Seda
 "Liverpool (We're Never Gonna...)", a 1983 song by Liverpool F.C.
 Liverpool (video game), a game based on the Liverpool F.C. team

Other uses 
 Liverpool (store), a chain of department stores in Mexico
 Liverpool rummy, a card game
 Liverpool-class lifeboat operated by the Royal National Lifeboat Institution (RNLI) 1931-1974
 Earl of Liverpool, a title in the British Peerage
 HMS Liverpool, seven ships of the Royal Navy
 Liverpool (privateer), an 18th-century British privateer
 University of Liverpool

See also 
 
 Livermore (disambiguation)